

Royal Swedish Air Force Staff College (FKHS) was established in 1939 and located in Stockholm. It was under the command of the Chief of the Swedish Air Force.

From the start, one-year higher courses in staff service or technical staff service were given and as well from 1942 a six month long general course. The latter course was mandatory for all officers in the air force (except for commissary staff) and the higher courses gave theoretical eligibility for higher positions.

The Flygkrigshögskolan should not be confused with the Flygvapnets krigshögskola (F 20), from 1982 the name of the Flygkadettskolan at the Swedish Air Force Flying School (F 5) which was established in 1942, which in 1944 moved to Uppsala, and later became the Flygvapnets Uppsalaskolor (F 20).

The Royal Swedish Air Force Staff College was discontinued in 1961 and the Royal Swedish Armed Forces Staff College was formed by merging war colleges of the different military branches, namely the Royal Swedish Army Staff College (established 1878), the Royal Swedish Naval Staff College (established 1898) and the Royal Swedish Air Force Staff College (established 1939).

Commanders
Commanders of FKHS:
1939–1941: Bengt Nordenskiöld
1941–1942: John Stenbeck
1942–1944: Nils Lindquist
1944–1945: Karl Silfverberg
1945–1947: Gustaf Adolf Westring
1947–1949: Björn Bjuggren
1949–1957: Björn Lindskog
1957–1961: Hugo Svenow

References

Notes

Print

Further reading

Military education and training in Sweden
Staff colleges
Higher education in Stockholm
Educational institutions established in 1939
Educational institutions disestablished in 1961
1939 establishments in Sweden
1961 disestablishments in Sweden
Defunct universities and colleges in Sweden
Stockholm Garrison